Bishop of Vancouver may refer to:

 the Anglican bishop of the Diocese of New Westminster (the see is located in Vancouver)
 the Roman Catholic archbishop of the Archdiocese of Vancouver